Nealbarbital (Censedal) is a barbiturate derivative developed by Aktiebolaget Pharmacia in the 1950s. It has sedative and hypnotic effects, and was used for the treatment of insomnia.

References 

Barbiturates
Allyl compounds
GABAA receptor positive allosteric modulators